Słopsk  is a village in the administrative district of Gmina Zabrodzie, within Wyszków County, Masovian Voivodeship, in east-central Poland. It lies near where the Fiszor river stems from the Bug River.

References

Villages in Wyszków County